The Exposition Internationale des Arts et Techniques dans la Vie Moderne (International Exposition of Art and Technology in Modern Life) was held from 25 May to 25 November 1937 in Paris, France. Both the Palais de Chaillot, housing the Musée de l'Homme, and the Palais de Tokyo, which houses the Musée d'Art Moderne de la Ville de Paris, were created for this exhibition that was officially sanctioned by the Bureau International des Expositions. A third building, housing the permanent Museum of Public Works, which was originally to be among the new museums created on the hill of Chaillot on the occasion of the Exhibition, was not built until January 1937 and inaugurated in March 1939.

Exhibitions

At first the centerpiece of the exposition was to be a  tower ("Phare du Monde") which was to have a spiraling road to a parking garage located at the top and a hotel and restaurant located above that. The idea was abandoned as it was far too expensive.

Pavilions

Finnish Pavilion
The Finnish pavilion was designed by Alvar Aalto, following an open architectural competition held in 1936, where he had won both first and second prize, the winning entry "Le bois est en marche" forming the basis for the pavilion as built. Finland had been given a difficult, sloping wooded site near the Trocadéro, something which Aalto was able to exploit in creating a ground plan featuring an irregular chain of volumes joined in as sort of collage - with small, open, cubic pavilions together with two larger exhibition halls. The entire complex curved around a shady garden with Japanese touches. The pavilion was also an advertisement for Finland's prime export, wood, as the building was built entirely of timber. French architecture historian Fabienne Chevallier has argued that at the time French critics were baffled by Aalto's building because though built of wood - and thus endorsing an image of what they perceived Finland to be - they were unprepared for Aalto's avant-gardism.

Canadian Pavilion
Canada had initially not planned to take in the exposition because of reasons of cost. In February 1936, at a party in Ottawa, Raymond Brugère, the French minister-plenipotentiary pressed the prime minister William Lyon Mackenzie King and his Quebec lieutenant Ernest Lapointe, about Canada taking part in the Exposition Internationale des Arts et Techniques dans la Vie Moderne, saying he very much wanted Canada to have a pavilion. King hesitated, saying he did not know if his government could afford the cost of building a pavilion, but Brugère forced his hand by sending a telegram to Paris, saying that Canada would take part, leading to an announcement being made in Paris.

Fitting in the architectural master-plan of the master architect Jacques Gréber at the foot of the Eiffel Tower, and inspired by the shape of a grain elevator, the Canadian pavilion included Joseph-Émile Brunet's 28-foot sculpture of a buffalo (1937), and Charles Comfort's The Romance of Nickel. Paintings by Brunet, sculpted panels on the outside of the structure, and several thematic stands inside the Canadian pavilion depicted aspects of Canadian culture.

Norwegian Pavilion 
It included Hannah Rygen's tapestry Ethiopia.

Spanish Pavilion
The Spanish pavilion was arranged by the President of Spain Spanish Republican government and built by the Spanish architect Josep Lluis Sert. It attracted extra attention because the exposition took place during the Spanish Civil War. The pavilion included Pablo Picasso's Guernica, the now-famous depiction of the horrors of war, as well as Alexander Calder's sculpture Mercury Fountain and Joan Miró's painting Catalan peasant in revolt.

German Pavilion
Two of the other notable pavilions were those of Nazi Germany and the Soviet Union. The organization of the world exhibition had placed the German and the Soviet pavilions directly across from each other. Hitler had desired to withdraw from participation, but his architect Albert Speer convinced him to participate, showing Hitler his plans for the German pavilion. Speer later revealed in his autobiographies that having had a clandestine look at the plans for the Soviet pavilion, he designed the German pavilion to represent a bulwark against Communism.

The preparation and construction of the exhibits were plagued by delay. On the opening day of the exhibition, only the German and the Soviet pavilions had been completed. This, as well as the fact that the two pavilions faced each other, turned the exhibition into a competition between the two great ideological rivals.

Speer's pavilion was culminated by a tall tower crowned with the symbols of the Nazi state: an eagle and the swastika. The pavilion was conceived as a monument to "German pride and achievement". It was to broadcast to the world that a new and powerful Germany had a restored sense of national pride. At night, the pavilion was illuminated by floodlights. Josef Thorak's sculpture Comradeship stood outside the pavilion, depicting two enormous nude males, clasping hands and standing defiantly side by side, in a pose of mutual defense and "racial camaraderie".

Soviet Pavilion
The architect of the Soviet pavilion was Boris Iofan. Vera Mukhina designed the large figurative sculpture on the pavilion. The grand building was topped by Worker and Kolkhoz Woman, a large momentum-exerting statue, of a male worker and a female peasant, their hands together, thrusting a hammer and a sickle. The statue was meant to symbolize the union of workers and peasants.

Italian Pavilion
Italy was vying for attention between Nazi Germany and the Soviet Union who presented themselves as great (and opposing) forces to be reckoned with. Italy was the benevolent dictatorship: sunny, open and Mediterranean, it was founded on discipline, order and unity. Marcello Piacentini was given the job of designing the pavilion exterior. He used a modern reinforced concrete frame combined with traditional elements such as colonnades, terraces, courts and galleries, the tower form, Classical rhythms and the use of Mediterranean marble and stucco. The pavilion was nestled under the Eiffel tower looking out over the Seine to the main part of the Exposition site.

Giuseppe Pagano was responsible for the overall co-ordination of the exhibits and was the first impact on entering the building, its large courtyard garden and its hall of honour. The main entry was through the Court of Honour that showcased life size examples of Italy's most important contribution to the history of technology. Arturo Martini's Victory of the Air presided over the space, her dark bronze form standing out against a seemingly infinite backdrop of blue-grey Venetian mosaic tiles. From there visitors could visit the Colonial Exhibits by Mario Sironi and the Gallery of Tourism before enjoying a plate of real spaghetti on the restaurant terrace. The courtyard garden was designed a respite from the exhibits with a symphony of green grass and green-glazed tiles set against red flowers and burgundy porphyry.

The Hall of Honour was the pavilion's most dramatic and evocative space. It also 'repurposed' an existing artwork: Mario Sironi's Corporative Italy (Fascist Work) mosaic from the 1936 Triennale that had now been completed with numerous figures engaged in different types of work and the figure of the imperial Roman eagle flying in from the right hand side. The 8m x 12 m work towered over the two-storey height space that occupied the top of the pavilion's tower, making it the centre piece of the pavilion's decorative and propaganda program. The enthroned figure of Italy represented corporatism, the economic policy of Italian fascism.  The room was a celebration of all those aspects of Fascist society that Pagano wholeheartedly believed in: social harmony, government input to generate industrial innovation and support for artists, professionals and craftsmen as well as workers. Here Pagano had the joy of working alongside five different artists and placing Italy's newest industrial material such as linoleum and Termolux (shatterproof plate glass) next to a sumptuous chandelier from Murano and amber marble.

British Pavilion
Britain had not been expecting such a competitive exposition, and its planned budget was only a small fraction of Germany's. Frank Pick, the chairman of the Council for Art and Industry, appointed Oliver Hill as architect but told him to avoid modernism and to focus on traditional crafts. The main architectural element of Hill's pavilion was a large white box, decorated externally with a painted frieze by John Skeaping and internally with giant photographic figures which included Neville Chamberlain fishing. Its contents were crafts objects arranged according to English words which had become loanwords in French, such as "sport" and "weekend", and included some items by renowned potter William Worrall. There was considerable British criticism that the result was unrepresentative of Britain and compared poorly to the other pavilions' projections of national strength.

Pavillon des Temps Nouveaux
The Pavillon des Temps Nouveaux (Pavilion of New Times) was a tent pavilion designed by Le Corbusier and Pierre Jeanneret.  In 1932, Le Corbusier heard the announcement of the proposed Expo and immediately issued an ambitious counter proposal. When funding for his project failed to materialise, he offered several scaled down versions, none of which attracted the necessary funding. Finally Le Corbusier was offered a budget of 500,000 FF with which he built a canvas pavilion filled with didacitic material promoting his utopian vision of future urbanism.

Awards
At the presentation, both Speer and Iofan, who also designed the Palace of Soviets that was planned to be constructed in Moscow, were awarded gold medals for their respective designs. Also, for his model of the Nuremberg party rally grounds, the jury granted Speer, to his and Hitler's surprise, a Grand Prix.
Artist Johanne deRibert Kajanus, mother of composer Georg Kajanus and film-maker Eva Norvind, granddaughter of composer and conductor Robert Kajanus, and grandmother of actress Nailea Norvind, won a bronze medal for her life-size sculpture of Mother and Child at the exhibition.
Polish modern architect Stanisław Brukalski won a bronze medal for his own house, designed together with his wife Barbara Brukalska, built in Warsaw in 1929, likely inspired by Gerrit Rietveld's Schröderhuis which he visited.
Polish company, First Factory of Locomotives in Poland Ltd., won a gold medal for the first Polish streamlined steam locomotive Pm36-1 (140 km/h) which arrived in Paris for the expo, another Polish company, Lilpop, Rau i Loewenstein, also won a gold medal for the tourist train (couchette, club carriage and bath/spa carriage). A curious Polish cruise train reserved for skiers included, in addition to the sleeping car, a bar-cinema-dancing car, two bathrooms, a complete installation of showers, a hairdressing salon and even an operating room for urgent intervention.
American architect Alden Dow won the "grand prize for residential architecture"  for his John S. Whitman House, built in Midland, Michigan, USA.<ref>Robinson, Sidney K., ‘'The Architecture of Alden B. Dow, Wayne State University Press, Detroit, MI 1983 p. 45</ref>
Soviet architect Andrey Kryachkov won the Grand Prix for designing his 100-flat building located in Novosibirsk.
Soviet-Jewish photographer Max Penson won the photography Grand Prix for his photograph "Uzbek Madonna" 
Serbian painter Ivan Tabaković won the Grand Prix for ceramics.
German textile designer, weaver and former Bauhaus student Margaretha Reichardt (1907–1984) won an honorary diploma for her Gobelin tapestry.
The Malashat al-Kiswa, the Cairo workshop that made textiles for the holy sites of Islam, won a Diplôme de Médaille d'Or ("diploma for a gold medal").
Commercial Artist Eva Harta,  daughter of Austrian Portrait Painter Felix Albrecht Harta won a silver medal for applied peasant motifs on wooden box tops.-letter dated March, 9th 1938 from International Jury to Eva Harta. Verified by Larry Heller, son of the artist.
Eurythmy ensemble from the Goetheanum (Dornach, Switzerland) was recognized with a gold medal for the best modern dance act.

Festivals of the Exposition
23 May – The Centenary of the Arc de Triomphe
5–13 June – The International Floralies
26 June – Motorboat races on the Seine
29 June – Dance Festival
July  – Midsummer Night's Dream (In the gardens of Bagatelle)
3 July – Horse Racing
4–11 July – Rebirth of the City
21 July – Colonial Festival
27 July – World Championship Boxing Matches
30 July – 10 August – The True Mystery of the Passion (before Notre Dame Cathedral)
12 September – Grape Harvest Festival
18 October — Naissance d'une cité – Birth of a City
Forty Two International Sporting Championships
Every Night: Visions of Fairyland on the Seine

 Gallery 

 Reproduction of the Soviet Pavilion 
After the Paris exhibition closed, Worker and Kolkhoz Woman was moved to the entrance of the All-Russia Exhibition Centre in Moscow, where it stood on a high platform. The sculpture was removed for restoration in 2003, intended to be completed by 2005. However, due to financial issues the restoration was delayed. On 28 November 2009 the sculpture was completed and returned to its place in front of the VDNKh. On 4 December 2009 the sculpture was revealed on the recreated pavilion structure.

 Reproduction of the Spanish Pavilion 

 In popular culture 
 Mags L. Halliday's 2002 novel History 101 shows the main characters visiting Picasso's Guernica at the Exhibition and realising that time "has been changed".

See also
Nazi architecture
Stalinist architecture
Streamline Moderne architecture

References

Further reading

 World's Fairs on the Eve of War: Science, Technology, and Modernity, 1937–1942 by Robert H. Kargon and others, 2015, University of Pittsburgh PressParis 1937 by E.P. Frank, with 100 stereoscopic photographs from Heinrich Hoffmann, 1937, Raumbild-Verlag Otto Schönstein; Classical Violence: Thierry Maulnier, French Fascist Aesthetics and the 1937 Paris World's Fair. by Mark Antiff Modernism/Modernity 15, no. 1 January 2008Grand Illusion: The Third Reich, the Paris Exposition, and the Cultural Seduction of France'' by Karen Fiss, Chicago, IL: U of Chicago P, 2009

External links

 
Exposition internationale de 1937 at the Médiathèque de l'Architecture et du Patrimoine 
L'Exposition Internationale de 1937 à Paris-Photographs
1937, exposition internationale des arts et techniques dans la vie moderne 
VESTIGES EXPOSITION INTERNATIONALE ARTS ET TECHNIQUES PARIS 1937 
JON PAUL SANK'S WORLD'S FAIRS PAGE

1937 in art
1937 festivals
1937 in France
20th century in Paris
Art exhibitions in France
Modernist architecture in France
World's fairs in Paris
Colonial exhibitions
Modernism